Wei Zongren (born 8 August 1998) is a Chinese footballer who plays for Guangzhou R&F.

Club career
Wei Zongren started his professional football career in August 2016 when he was loaned to Hong Kong Premier League side R&F, which was the satellite team of Guangzhou R&F. He made his senior debut on 18 September 2016 in the 2016–17 Hong Kong Senior Challenge Shield against BC Glory Sky, coming on as a substitute for Lau Tak Yan in the 57th minute. His league debut came on 24 September 2016 in a 2–0 away defeat against BC Glory Sky.

Career statistics
 

1League Cups include Hong Kong Senior Challenge Shield, Hong Kong League Cup and Hong Kong Sapling Cup.

References

1998 births
Living people
Chinese footballers
People from Wuzhou
Footballers from Guangxi
Guangzhou City F.C. players
Association football midfielders
Hong Kong Premier League players